Veysel Aksu (born 1 January 1985) is a Turkish professional footballer who plays as a defender for Tirespor.

References

External links
 
 

1985 births
Living people
Turkish footballers
Turkey youth international footballers
Association football defenders
İstanbul Başakşehir F.K. players
Süper Lig players
People from Turgutlu
TFF First League players